Hosius may refer to:

People
 Hosius of Corduba (c. 257-359), bishop, leader of the First Council of Nicaea, and advisor of Constantine the Great
 Stanislaus Hosius (1504-1579), bishop of Chełmno and Warmia, cardinal, and leader of the Counter-Reformation
 Stanisław Józef Hozjusz (1674-1738), bishop of Przemyśl, Livonia, Kamianets-Podilskyi and Poznań
 Ulrich Hosius (c. 1455-1535), mint-master, the horodniczy of Vilnius, and father of cardinal Stanislaus Hosius

Other uses
 Hozyusz coat of arms, used by several noble families in the Kingdom of Poland and Grand Duchy of Lithuania

See also
 Hozjusz (disambiguation)